Yerkheda is a census town in Nagpur district in the Indian state of Maharashtra.

Demographics
 India census, Yerkheda had a population of 10,367. Males constitute 51% of the population and females 49%. Yerkheda has an average literacy rate of 79%, higher than the national average of 59.5%: male literacy is 84%, and female literacy is 73%. In Yerkheda, 12% of the population is under 6 years of age.

References

Cities and towns in Nagpur district